Horror Show is the sixth studio album from the American heavy metal band Iced Earth, released June 26, 2001. It is a concept album based on classic monsters and horror-movie icons, including Dracula, Frankenstein, and The Phantom. It was the first Iced Earth album to feature drummer Richard Christy, and the only album to feature Steve Di Giorgio on bass, though he did not tour with the band.  Horror Show is usually considered Iced Earth's only straightforward power metal release, as little of the thrash metal influence from the band's earlier works is present.  This album also featured more prominent usage of Matt Barlow's multi-layered vocals as a center point for the songs.

There was a special limited-edition two-disc set. The second disc included the instrumental track, "Transylvania", an Iron Maiden cover, along with an interview with bandleader/rhythm guitarist Jon Schaffer. There is also a single-disc version with "Transylvania", but without the interview. The song "Dracula" includes the line "the blood is the life", a quote from Deuteronomy 12:23. However, it is likely lifted from the 1992 version of Bram Stoker's Dracula which also features the line. As in "Dracula", many of the lyrics are lifted straight from the movies they were inspired by. Unlike other releases, it features much writing from Matt Barlow.

By the end of the song "Damien" there is a section where Jon's reversed voice repeats the message that is also in the middle, silent section of the song. So, if the song is played backwards, the true message can be heard. This kind of reversed voice was also done by Iron Maiden in the beginning of their song "Still Life" of their fourth studio album Piece of Mind.

Track listing 
All lyrics and music written by Jon Schaffer, except where noted.

Track 6 ("Jekyll & Hyde")'s official title misspells the name of the character as "Jeckyl".

Limited edition
The initial pressing was presented in a standard two-disc jewel case with no reference to the tracks on the bonus disc (nor the disc itself) except for a sticker on the front. Because "Transylvania" is moved out of the track list, "Dragon's Child" has its full ending, increasing its length.

Disc one

Disc two

Personnel 
 Matt Barlow – vocals
 Jon Schaffer – rhythm, lead and acoustic guitar, mandolin, keyboards, vocal
 Larry Tarnowski – guitar solos in all songs except "Ghost of Freedom"
 Richard Christy – drums
Steve Di Giorgio – bass guitar (studio recording only)

Additional personnel 
 Yunhui Percifield – lead vocal in "The Phantom Opera Ghost" as "Christine", backing vocals
 Richie Wilkison – backing vocals
 Rafaela Farias – backing vocals
 Sam King – backing vocals
 Jim Morris – backing vocals, keys, guitar solo in "Ghost of Freedom"
 Howard Helm – keys (pipe organ) on "The Phantom Opera Ghost"

Charts

Monthly

References

2001 albums
Albums with cover art by Travis Smith (artist)
Century Media Records albums
Concept albums
Iced Earth albums